All Nations University was founded by Rev. Dr. Samuel Donkor in Ghana.  It began with 37 students in October 2002 and has now expanded to over 2000 students. It became an accredited university college in Ghana in October 2002. The university is affiliated to Kwame Nkrumah University of Science and Technology and in collaboration with SRM Institute of Science and Technology (India). On May 28, 2020, All Nations was granted a presidential charter by the President of Ghana.

All Nations University is located in Koforidua in the Eastern Region of Ghana.

Programmes
The university offers undergraduate programmes in Oil and Gas Engineering, Biomedical Engineering, Computer Engineering, Computer Science (Hons.), Electronics, Communications Engineering, Entrepreneurship, Human Resource Management, Finance & Finance, Accounting and Marketing as well as Nursing and Biblical Studies.https://myhealthbasics.site/courses-offered-at-all-nations-university-2/

Notable Achievements
In July 2017, GhanaSat-1, Ghana's first satellite in space was launched from the International Space Station. GhanaSat-1 was designed, assembled, and tested by three students from the university. The project was supported by Kyushu Institute of Technology (KIT) as part of the Joint Global Multi-Nation Birds Satellite project, which is a cross-border interdisciplinary satellite project for non-space faring countries supported by Japan. The satellite launch was broadcast live and watched by over 400 people at All Nations University.

Gallery

See also
List of universities in Ghana

Notes

External links

Ghana Tertiary Education Commission
Official website 
connect with us
SRM University

Education in the Eastern Region (Ghana)
Universities in Ghana
Educational institutions established in 2002
2002 establishments in Ghana